The Nakusp Music Fest was an annual music festival held in Nakusp, British Columbia, which is situated in the West Kootenay region of British Columbia, Canada. Held every summer usually in July, it was touted as the British Columbia Interior's largest classic rock festival, although classic rock was not the only genre of music played at the event.

The inaugural event was held in 2004 with more than ten acts, including of Dr. Hook, Randy Bachman, Trooper and Wide Mouth Mason.
Since then, Nakusp Music Festival has featured Smash Mouth, Collective Soul, 54-40, Steppenwolf, Aaron Pritchett and Paul Rodgers. This year's line-up will include The Doobie Brothers, Kevin Costner & Modern West, The Sheepdogs Soul Asylum, Spirit of the West. Canned Heat, Savoy Brown, Honeymoon Suite.

2011 lineup

July 15th
The Sheepdogs
Mobadass
The Led Zeppelin Show
Honeymoon Suite

July 16th
 Kevin Costner and Modern West
 Spirit of the West
 Skavenjah
 Canned Heat
 Gary Hoey
 The Pack AD
 Odds
 Tambura Rasa

July 17th
 The Doobie Brothers
 Soul Asylum
 Grapes of Wrath
 Savoy Brown
 Canned Heat
 Alan Kirk Band
 The Perms

2010 lineup

July 16th
54-40
Headpins
Powder Blues Band
The Mason Rack Band

July 17th
 Bachman–Turner Overdrive
 Corb Lund and the Hurtin' Albertans
 The Trews
 Raul Malo (The Mavericks)
 Delhi 2 Dublin
 Rude City Riot
 LeeRoy Stagger and the Wildflowers
 Shades of Loud

July 18th
 Eric Burdon and the Animals
 Doc Walker
 Bif Naked
 Default
 Mudmen
 Dustin Bentall
 Lucy and the Lucky Four

2009 lineup

July 17th
Sweet
Trooper
Nick Gilder & Sweeney Todd
The Hip Replacement

July 18th
 Blues Traveler
 Sam Moore
 The Yardbirds
 East Blues Experience
 Skavenjah
 Sweatshop Union
 Delhi2Dublin
 Mad Shadow
 Hot Rash

July 19th
 John Kay & Steppenwolf
 Colin James
 Emerson Drive
 Greg Rolie Band (Santana original lead singer)
 The Zombies
 Suzie McNeil
 MOBADASS
 Eddie Fryer and the Lost Tribe

2008 lineup

July 18th
Kenny Shields & Streetheart
Prism
Skavenjah
Funkafeelya

July 19th
 Smash Mouth
 The Commitments
 BC/DC
 Brittany Kalesnikoff
 Johnny Reid
 Brian Byrne
 Ryan Donn
 Rita Chiarell

July 20th
 Honeymoon Suite
 Paul Rodgers
 Gin Blossoms
 MerQury
 McCuaig
 Aaron Pritchett
 Cassidy Wethal & 23 North
 Jimmy Bowskill

Past lineups

2007

2006

2005

2004

References

Music festivals established in 2004
Music festivals disestablished in 2011
Rock festivals in Canada
Music festivals in British Columbia
Arrow Lakes
2004 establishments in British Columbia
2011 disestablishments in British Columbia